Ben Spencer (born 31 July 1992) is an English professional rugby union player who plays as a scrum-half for Bath in Premiership Rugby.

Club career
Spencer represented Cambridge during the 2010–11 National League 1 season. In August 2011, after impressing during a pre-season trial, Spencer signed for Saracens. In March 2015, Spencer kicked a last-minute penalty as Saracens defeated Exeter Chiefs 23-20 in the final of the Anglo-Welsh Cup. In May 2016, Spencer was a second-half substitute for Richard Wigglesworth as Sarries defeated Racing 92 to win the European Rugby Champions Cup for the first time. The following season, Spencer was again a used replacement as Saracens defeated ASM Clermont Auvergne to retain their European title. He was Saracens' top try scorer in the 2017/18 season. He scored a penalty as Saracens beat Exeter 27-10 in the Premiership final in 2018, and then the following year scored a try as Saracens retained the Premiership title. Spencer won his third European Rugby Champions Cup, this time starting the final, as Saracens defeated Leinster.

He joined Bath in a three-year deal ahead of recommencement of the 2019–20 season.

International career
Spencer was a member of the England under-20 squad that competed at the 2012 IRB Junior World Championship in South Africa. In January 2012, Spencer scored a try on his debut for the England Saxons in a victory against Ireland Wolfhounds.

On 27 October 2019 he was called up to England's squad for the 2019 Rugby World Cup as an injury replacement for Willi Heinz.

Honours
 Aviva Premiership: 2015, 2016, 2018, 2019
 European Rugby Champions Cup: 2016, 2017, 2019
 Anglo-Welsh Cup: 2015

References

External links
 Saracens profile

1992 births
Living people
English rugby union players
Cambridge R.U.F.C. players
Saracens F.C. players
Bath Rugby players
Rugby union scrum-halves
Rugby union players from Stockport
People educated at Bramhall High School
England international rugby union players